Harry Ashby may refer to:
Harry Ashby (engraver) (1744–1818), English engraver
Harry Ashby (footballer) (1875–1926), English footballer
Harry Ashby (golfer) (1946–2010), English golfer

See also
Henry Ashby (disambiguation)
Harold Ashby (1925–2003), American jazz tenor saxophonist
Hal Ashby (1929–1988), American film director and editor